is a Japanese engineering company that specializes in gearboxes, rotors, motors and robotics.

History 

The company was founded in 2003 and has several subsidiaries.

In 2010, the company acquired the Business Segment Door Automation division of the Swiss company Dormakaba.

Management 

Since 2017, Kazuaki Kotani has served as chairman and Katsuhiro Teramoto has served as president of Nabtesco.

Products 

The company manufactures Cyclodial drives, railway brakes and platform screen doors.

References

External links

Official Website 

Companies of Japan
Manufacturing companies based in Tokyo
Companies listed on the Tokyo Stock Exchange
Japanese companies established in 2003
Manufacturing companies established in 2003
Robotics companies of Japan
Industrial robotics
Japanese brands